Ćićarija, is a mountainous plateau in the northern and northeastern part of the Istria peninsula,  long and  wide. It mostly lies in Croatia, while its northern part lies in southwestern Slovenia (the traditional region of Inner Carniola).

At  (2001), Ćićarija is sparsely populated, due to its karst landscape, poor economic development and rough climate.

Name
The name Ćićarija is derived from the South Slavic term Ćić, which refers to Istrians living in the area around the Učka Mountains, originally referring to the Vlachs and Istro-Romanians of the area. The ethnonym is believed to derive from the Istro-Romanian word ce 'what', which is a semantic basis for other regional ethnonyms (cf. Kajkavian, Chakavian, etc.).

Sources

References

External links

Landforms of Istria County
Dinaric Alps
Plateaus of Croatia
Karst plateaus of Slovenia
Plateaus of Inner Carniola